Early Graves is an American metal band from San Francisco, California, United States, that includes aspects of thrash and hardcore in their music. The band formed in 2007 from the ashes of tech metal band Apiary.  They have toured the U.S. extensively with The Handshake Murders, Gaza, The Funeral Pyre and Unearth, amongst many others.  Their debut album We: The Guillotine was released worldwide August 19, 2008 on Ironclad/Metalblade Records. On June 22, 2010, they released a second album, Goner.

Accident
Early on Monday, August 2, 2010, vocalist Makh Daniels was killed in a van accident while traveling from Oregon to Reno, Nevada.

Ironclad Recordings, who in June 2010 released Early Graves' second album titled Goner, has issued the following statement:

“Last night Makh Daniels, vocalist of Early Graves, tragically lost his life in a van accident while the band was traveling from Oregon to Nevada. An official statement will be released in time, but for now our thoughts are with Makh’s family, friends and bandmates during this terrible time.”

Line-up

Current members
Chris Brock – vocals, guitar
Dan Sneddon – drums
Tyler Jensen – guitar
Matt O'Brien – bass
John Strachan – vocals

Former members
Makh Daniels – vocals (2007 - 8/2/2010) - deceased

Discography

References

Thrash metal musical groups from California
Musical groups established in 2007
Hardcore punk groups from California
Musical groups from San Francisco
2007 establishments in California
No Sleep Records artists